"The Boarding House" is a short story by James Joyce published in his 1914 collection Dubliners.

Plot summary
 
Characters

 Mrs. Mooney – Determined, clever, and brave daughter of Butcher
 Butcher- Father of Mrs. Mooney 
 Mr. Mooney- Husband of Mrs. Mooney and works with Butcher
 Polly Mooney- Beautiful and pretty girl, daughter of Mr. and Mrs. Mooney.
 Jack Mooney- Son of Mrs. and Mr. Mooney
 Mr. Doran- Highly educated officer, is in a relationship with Polly Mooney

Mrs. Mooney looks forward to her confrontation, which she intends to “win” by defending her daughter’s honor and convincing Mr. Doran to offer his hand in marriage. Waiting for the time to pass, Mrs. Mooney figures the odds are in her favor, considering that Mr. Doran, who has worked for a wine merchant for thirteen years and garnered much respect, will choose the option that least harms his career.

Meanwhile, Mr. Doran anguishes over the impending meeting with Mrs. Mooney. As he clumsily grooms himself for the appointment, he reviews the difficult confession to his priest that he made on Saturday evening, in which he was harshly reproved for his romantic affair. He knows he can either marry Polly or run away, the latter an option that would ruin his sound reputation. Convincing himself that he has been duped, Mr. Doran bemoans Polly’s unimpressive family, her ill manners, and her poor grammar, and wonders how he can remain free and unmarried. In this vexed moment Polly enters the room and threatens to end her life out of unhappiness. In her presence, Mr. Doran begins to remember how he was bewitched by Polly’s beauty and kindness, but he still wavers about his decision.

Interpretation 
It is noted that one of the songs Polly sings is "I'm a naughty girl," which Joyce scholar Zack Bowen suggested foreshadows Polly's affair with Mr. Doran.

References

Joyce, James. Dubliners (London: Grant Richards, 1914)

External links
 

Short stories by James Joyce
1914 short stories

zh:寄宿家庭